Jwar Bhata may refer to: 

 Jwar Bhata (1944 film), directed by Amiya Chakraborty
 Jwar Bhata (1973 film), directed by Adurthi Subba Rao